Thoa may refer to:

 Thoa, a synonym for a genus of gymnosperms, Gnetum
 Thoa, a synonym for a genus of hydrozoans, Halecium